Edward Droste (born October 22, 1978) is an American singer-songwriter and musician, formerly of the rock band Grizzly Bear. The group began as the solo effort of Droste with the release of 2004's Horn of Plenty, originally released on Kanine Records. All songs were written and performed by Droste. By 2005, the group expanded into a four-piece, with Droste still as a contributing songwriter. He left the group in 2020.

Early life
Droste was born in Massachusetts, the son of Diana (née Forbes) and Bruce F. Droste. His maternal grandfather was conductor and musicologist Elliot Forbes. Through his mother's Forbes line, he is related to singer China Forbes. He attended elementary school at Shady Hill School in Cambridge, Massachusetts, where his mother is a music teacher, and high school at Concord Academy in Concord, Massachusetts. He attended high school with Refinery29 founder Philippe von Borries. He attended Hampshire College for one year in 1999 before transferring to and graduating from New York University's Gallatin School of Individualized Study in 2003.

Career 
Droste began composing and performing songs on a solo basis as Grizzly Bear, releasing the album Horn of Plenty in 2004, with some contributions from drummer Christopher Bear. The two then joined with Chris Taylor, and eventually Daniel Rossen, to form the current four-piece band. Droste has said of the gestation of the band, "Daniel [Rossen] and I are the principal songwriters, but we also have the most issues with being performers. I strongly reject the notion that I have to do stage kicks or be some sort of persona. I respect artists that have an act, a look, a shtick. That’s all fine and dandy, but with our songs, it would feel like the biggest farce. It took us a long time to get comfortable; the whole thing was four people growing into each other."

In a 2020 episode of Lunch Therapy, Droste announced that he left Grizzly Bear to become a therapist.

Other musical collaborations
 April 2007 – Edward appeared as a guest vocalist on "To a Fault" from  Dntel's fourth album, Dumb Luck, released on Sub Pop Records.
 September 2007 – Edward sang with Beirut in the video for their song "Cliquot" for La Blogothèque's video series.
 March 2008 – Edward joined Owen Pallett to cover Björk's "Possibly Maybe" for Stereogums tribute to Björk's album, Post.
 February 2011 – Edward collaborated on the song "I'm Losing Myself" with Fleet Foxes frontman Robin Pecknold in Los Angeles.
 May 2016 – Edward and Little Joy's Binki Shapiro collaborated on a cover of the Grateful Dead song "Loser" for the Grateful Dead tribute album Day of the Dead.
 July 15, 2016 – Edward appeared as a guest at Montreux Jazz Festival to cover "Go" with Woodkid
 April 2017 – Edward collaborated on the duet "Faultline" with singer DEDE and producers Kingdom and Tim K on the label Fresh Selects
 June 2019 – Fresh Selects releases a remix of DEDE and Ed's duet "Faultline" by Honey Dijon and Tim K
 October 2020 - Featured on the single "For the Sky" by Haerts

Personal life
In September 2011, Droste married his long-time boyfriend, interior designer Chad McPhail. On August 4, 2014, Droste announced his divorce from McPhail via Twitter, stating that he's "amicably and lovingly divorcing [his] husband". Droste has been in a relationship with Simon Renggli since 2015.

Droste was featured on the cover of Hello Mr. in 2013.

Edward is a second cousin on his father's side to another Ed Droste, who is a co-founder of the Hooters restaurant chain.

Droste has mentioned his struggles with tinnitus on several occasions.

References

1978 births
21st-century American singers
American indie pop musicians
American male guitarists
American male singer-songwriters
American gay musicians
Hampshire College alumni
LGBT people from Massachusetts
American LGBT singers
American LGBT songwriters
Living people
Singer-songwriters from Massachusetts
21st-century American guitarists
Guitarists from Massachusetts
Concord Academy alumni
New York University Gallatin School of Individualized Study alumni
21st-century American male singers
Gay singers
Gay songwriters
Grizzly Bear (band) members
20th-century LGBT people
21st-century LGBT people
Shady Hill School alumni
Forbes family
American gay writers